Raffaele Ametrano (born 15 February 1973 in Castellammare di Stabia, Province of Naples) is a former Italian footballer who played as a midfielder. He represented Italy at the 1996 Summer Olympics. In 2010, he obtained a UEFA A coaching license, making him eligible to coach Lega Pro teams. He then became the assistant coach of F.B. Brindisi 1912.

Honours
Italy U21
 1996 UEFA European Under-21 Football Championship winner.

References

External links

1973 births
Living people
People from Castellammare di Stabia
Italian footballers
Italian football managers
Serie A players
Serie B players
Italy under-21 international footballers
Footballers at the 1996 Summer Olympics
Olympic footballers of Italy
Udinese Calcio players
Juventus F.C. players
Hellas Verona F.C. players
Empoli F.C. players
Genoa C.F.C. players
U.S. Salernitana 1919 players
Cagliari Calcio players
F.C. Crotone players
A.C.R. Messina players
U.S. Avellino 1912 players
S.S. Juve Stabia players
Association football midfielders
S.S. Ischia Isolaverde players
Footballers from Campania
Sportspeople from the Province of Naples